Robert Drynan Kirkpatrick (December 1, 1915 – February 20, 1988) was a Canadian professional ice hockey player, who played 49 games in the National Hockey League with the New York Rangers during the 1942–43 season. The rest of his career, which lasted from 1934 to 1949, was mainly spent in the minor leagues. Kirkpatrick was born in Regina, Saskatchewan, but grew up in Flin Flon, Manitoba.

Career statistics

Regular season and playoffs

External links
 

1915 births
1988 deaths
Canadian expatriate ice hockey players in the United States
Canadian ice hockey centres
Earls Court Rangers players
Ice hockey people from Manitoba
Ice hockey people from Saskatchewan
New York Rangers players
New York Rovers players
Regina Pats players
St. Paul Saints (USHL) players
Sportspeople from Flin Flon
Sportspeople from Regina, Saskatchewan